The Coupe de France 1989–90 was its 73rd edition. It was won by Montpellier HSC.

Round of 16

Quarter-finals

Semi-finals

Final

References

French federation

1989–90 domestic association football cups
1989–90 in French football
1989-90